France participated in the Eurovision Song Contest 2003 with the song "Monts et merveilles" written by Hocine Hallaf. The song was performed by Louisa Baïleche. The French broadcaster France Télévisions in collaboration with the television channel France 3 internally selected the French entry for the 2003 contest in Riga, Latvia. "Monts et merveilles" was officially presented to the public by France 3 as the French entry on 7 March 2003 during the France 3 programme Le Fabuleux Destin de....

As a member of the "Big Four", France automatically qualified to compete in the Eurovision Song Contest. Performing in position 19, France placed eighteenth out of the 26 participating countries with 19 points.

Background 

France first won the contest in 1958 with "Dors, mon amour" performed by André Claveau. In the 1960s, they won three times, with "Tom Pillibi" performed by Jacqueline Boyer in 1960, "Un premier amour" performed by Isabelle Aubret in 1962 and "Un jour, un enfant" performed by Frida Boccara, who won in 1969 in a four-way tie with the Netherlands, Spain and the United Kingdom. France's fifth victory came in 1977, when Marie Myriam won with the song "L'oiseau et l'enfant". France have also finished second four times, with Paule Desjardins in 1957, Catherine Ferry in 1976, Joëlle Ursull in 1990 and Amina in 1991, who lost out to Sweden's Carola in a tie-break. In the 21st century, France has had less success, only making the top ten two times, with Natasha St-Pier finishing fourth in 2001 and Sandrine François finishing fifth in 2002.

The French national broadcaster, France Télévisions, broadcasts the event within France and delegates the selection of the nation's entry to the television channel France 3. The French broadcaster had used both national finals and internal selection to choose the French entry in the past. The 1999 and 2000 French entries were selected via a national final that featured several competing acts. In 2001 and 2002, the broadcaster opted to internally select the French entry, a procedure that was continued in order to select the 2003 entry.

Before Eurovision

Internal selection 
France 3 announced in early 2003 that the French entry for the 2003 Eurovision Song Contest would be selected internally. On 13 January 2003, the broadcaster opened a submission period in order for interested artists and songwriters to submit their proposals. On 7 March 2003, France 3 announced during the France 3 programme Le Fabuleux Destin de..., hosted by Isabelle Giordano, that the French entry for the Eurovision Song Contest 2003 would be "Monts et merveilles" performed by Louisa Baïleche. The song was written by Hocine Hallaf. The selection committee of France 3 considered two entries, "Monts et merveilles" performed by Louisa Baïleche and "Un jour, je t'emmènerai" performed by Thibault Durand, before finalising their decision internally on 28 February 2003.

At Eurovision 
As a member of the "Big 4", France automatically qualified to compete in the Eurovision Song Contest 2003 on 24 May 2003. During the running order draw on 29 November 2003, France was placed to perform in position 19, following the entry from Norway and before the entry from Poland. France placed eighteenth in the final, scoring 19 points.

In France, the show was broadcast on France 3 with commentary by Laurent Ruquier and Isabelle Mergault, as well as via radio on France Bleu with commentary by Laurent Boyer. The French spokesperson, who announced the French votes during the show, was Sandrine François who represented France in the 2002 contest.

Voting 
Below is a breakdown of points awarded to France and awarded by France in the contest.

References 

2003
Countries in the Eurovision Song Contest 2003
Eurovision
Eurovision